William Sandys may refer to:

William Sandys, 1st Baron Sandys (1470–1540), English diplomat
William Sandys, 3rd Baron Sandys (died 1623)
William Sandys, 4th Baron Sandys (died 1629)
William Sandys, 6th Baron Sandys (died 1668), Cavalier officer in the Royalist army during the English Civil War
William Sandys (MP for Winchester) (–1628), English MP and magistrate
William Sandys (waterworks engineer) (1607–1669), English MP and waterworks engineer
William Sandys (antiquarian) (1792–1874), English antiquarian and Christmas carol collector

See also
Sandys (surname)
William Sands (disambiguation)